Magor Township is one of sixteen townships in Hancock County, Iowa, USA.  As of the 2000 census, its population was 450.

History
Magor Township was founded in 1878. It was named for Henry Magor, a pioneer settler.

Geography
According to the United States Census Bureau, Magor Township covers an area of 36.12 square miles (93.54 square kilometers).

Cities, towns, villages
 Corwith (south three-quarters)

Unincorporated towns
 Denhart at 
(This list is based on USGS data and may include former settlements.)

Adjacent townships
 Boone Township (north)
 Erin Township (northeast)
 Amsterdam Township (east)
 Norway Township, Wright County (southeast)
 Boone Township, Wright County (south)
 Vernon Township, Humboldt County (southwest)
 Lu Verne Township, Kossuth County (west)
 Prairie Township, Kossuth County (northwest)

Cemeteries
The township contains these three cemeteries: Corwith, Magor Township and Saint Marys.

School districts
 Corwith-Wesley Community School District
 West Hancock Community School District

Political districts
 Iowa's 4th congressional district
 State House District 11
 State Senate District 6

References
 United States Census Bureau 2008 TIGER/Line Shapefiles
 United States Board on Geographic Names (GNIS)
 United States National Atlas

External links
 US-Counties.com
 City-Data.com

Townships in Hancock County, Iowa
Townships in Iowa